{{Infobox football club
| clubname = Passo Fundo
| image = Esporte Clube Passo Fundo.png
| fullname = Esporte Clube Passo Fundo
| founded = January 10, 1986
|nickname=Tricolor14Galo do PlanaltoO Clube de Todos NósO Mais Copeiro''O clube que nasceu campeão| ground = Estádio Vermelhão da Serra
| capacity = 19,000
| owntitle = 
| owner = 
| chrtitle = President
| chairman = Carlos Augusto Castro
| mgrtitle = Head Coach
| manager = Leocir Dall’Astra
| league = Campeonato Gaúcho Série A2
| season = 2017
| position = 
| website = http://www.esporteclubepassofundo.com.br/
| kit_alt1 = 
| pattern_la1 = _passofundo20h
| pattern_b1 = _passofundo20h
| pattern_ra1 = _passofundo20h
| pattern_sh1 = _passofundo19h
| pattern_so1 = _passofundo19h
| leftarm1 = FF0000
| body1 = FF0000
| rightarm1 = FF0000
| shorts1 = 900020
| socks1 = 900020
| kit_alt2 = 
| pattern_la2 = _passofundo20f
| pattern_b2 = _passofundo20f
| pattern_ra2 = _passofundo20f
| pattern_sh2 = _passofundo19a
| pattern_so2 = _passofundo19a
| leftarm2 = FFFFFF
| body2 = FFFFFF
| rightarm2 = FFFFFF
| shorts2 = FFFFFF
| socks2 = FFFFFF
| kit_alt3 = 
| pattern_la3 = 
| pattern_b3 = 
| pattern_ra3 = 
| pattern_sh3 = 
| pattern_so3 = 
| pattern_name3 = 
| leftarm3 = 
| body3 = 
| rightarm3 = 
| shorts3 = 
| socks3 = 
| American = true
}}Esporte Clube Passo Fundo, commonly referred to as Passo Fundo, is a Brazilian football club based in Passo Fundo, Rio Grande do Sul. It currently plays in Campeonato Gaúcho Série A2, the second level of the Rio Grande do Sul state football league.

History
The club was founded on January 10, 1986 as a result of a merger between 14 de Julho (founded in 1921) and Gaúcho (founded in 1918), and adopted as its colors 14 de Julho's red and Gaúcho's green. Gaúcho left the merger after only one year, but the club kept its name and colors. They won the Campeonato Gaúcho Second Division in 1986.

AchievementsCampeonato Gaúcho Second Division: Winners (1): 1986
 Runners-up (1) 2012Campeonato Gaúcho First Division: 6th (1): 1989

Season Records

Notes:*
 2000 and 2001:Four teams had byes in the first stage (Juventude and Caxias(2001)/Pelotas(2002) )2003 and 2004:'''  and  did not participate in the regular first stage.

Stadium
Esporte Clube Passo Fundo play their home games at Estádio Vermelhão da Serra. The stadium has a maximum capacity of 19,000 people.

Players

References

External links
 Official website

Association football clubs established in 1986
Football clubs in Rio Grande do Sul
1986 establishments in Brazil